William Bleasdell Cameron was born July 26, 1862, in Trenton, Canada West. He is best known as being one of the survivors of the Frog Lake Massacre, and his book The War Trail of Big Bear that recounts his experiences of the massacre and his captivity.

In 1885 he was working as a clerk for the Hudson's Bay Company store at Frog Lake in the District of Saskatchewan, North-West Territories. He survived the Frog Lake Massacre of the North-West Rebellion on April 2, 1885, and was held captive for two months by Big Bear's band of Cree.

After being freed he was attached to Major General Thomas Bland Strange's column and later was awarded the North West Canada Medal for his role as a scout and guide.(pages 51–52)

Cameron was in Regina in 1885 during the trial of Big Bear, where he testified in Big Bear's defence. He testified he had heard Big Bear try to stop the massacre at Frog Lake.

Cameron founded and edited the newspaper Vermilion Signal, served on the town council of Vermilion, Alberta, and was briefly editor of the magazine Field and Stream, New York.

He died in Meadow Lake, Saskatchewan, on March 4, 1951, of double pneumonia at age 88. The inscription on his headstone reads "G. Scout, William B. Cameron, Northwest Field Force, 4th March, 1951—Rest In Peace."(p. 155)

Books
Blood Red the Sun
The War Trail of Big Bear
A month in the United States and Canada in the autumn of 1873
Eyewitness To History: William Bleasdell Cameron, Frontier Journalist

References

External links
 
 A photograph taken on Poundmaker Reserve September 22, 1947, of William Bleasdell Cameron with Horse Child ( in Cree), who was the son of Big Bear. They are looking at a photograph of themselves together in Regina in 1885 during the trial of Big Bear

1862 births
1951 deaths
People from Quinte West
Hudson's Bay Company people
Canadian non-fiction writers
Canadian newspaper editors
Canadian male journalists
Canadian magazine editors
People of the North-West Rebellion